The Door of the Dead or the Door of Death may refer to:

 Door of Death, a book in the Fear Street Sagas fiction series
 Door of the Dead in St. Peter's Basilica, a bronze door in Vatican City
 Porte des Morts (the Door of Death), a strait in Wisconsin, United States